David Island is an ice-covered island,  long and  wide, marked by rock exposures along its north and east sides, lying off Davis Peninsula in the Shackleton Ice Shelf in Antarctica. It was discovered in November 1912 by the Western Base party of the Australasian Antarctic Expedition (AAE) under Douglas Mawson. Mawson named the island for Edgeworth David, a member of the AAE Advisory Committee.

See also 
 Baldwin Rocks
 List of antarctic and sub-antarctic islands

References
 

Islands of Queen Mary Land